= Ed Wu =

Ed Xuekui Wu is Lam Woo Endowed and Chair Professor of Biomedical Engineering at the University of Hong Kong. He is an engineering scientist in area of biomedical imaging, including magnetic resonance imaging (MRI) engineering and applications in basic life sciences and medicine. Professor Wu was elected to Fellow of the Institute of Electrical and Electronics Engineers (IEEE) in 2014, Fellow of International Society for Magnetic Resonance in Medicine (ISMRM) in 2013, Fellow of American Institute of Bioenginering and Medical Engineering (AIMBE) in 2010, and Fellow of Hong Kong Academy of Engineering Sciences (HKAES) in 2019 for contributions to in vivo MRI methods and engineering. Professor Wu worked at Columbia University in New York City from 1989 to 2003 as a faculty before joining the University of Hong Kong in 2003.
